A list of films produced in France in 1974.

See also
1974 in France

Notes

References

External links
 French films of 1974 at the Internet Movie Database
French films of 1974 at Cinema-francais.fr

1974
Films
French